Akala Krestos (died 3 September 1685) was a high court administrator during the reigns of Yohannes I and Iyasu I.

Biography 
Akala Krestos started his career during the reign of Emperor Fasilides. However it's in the year 1677 that he was mentioned as an official at the court of Yohannes I, with the title of Bagerond. By 1682 he was serving as Blattengeta.  

On 15th of July 1682, the ailing Emperor Yohannes I made Iyasu I his successor. Blattengeta Akala Krestos was among the dignitaries witnessing Yohannes I final proclamation, other notables were Kanafero and Za-Wald (both Azzaz), basha Lesana Krestos, dejazmach's Anestasyos and Delba Iyasus, and fitawrari Fesseha Krestos. 

On 20 March 1683 he was relieved from his duties. He died almost certainly in Gondar a few years later.

Notes

References

17th-century Ethiopian people
History of Ethiopia